Alpine County Courthouse is a building built in 1928 in Markleeville, California.

It was listed on the National Register of Historic Places in 2004.

The courthouse was constructed of a light cream colored massive rhyolite tuff which was quarried above nearby Silver Mountain City. Designed by prolific Nevada architect Frederic Joseph DeLongchamps, the building was originally intended to be a two-story structure but financial considerations limited it to one story.  The Alpine County courthouse is still in use.

References

Further reading

External links

Courthouses on the National Register of Historic Places in California
Buildings and structures in Alpine County, California
County courthouses in California
Frederic Joseph DeLongchamps buildings
National Register of Historic Places in Alpine County, California
Government buildings completed in 1928
1928 establishments in California